Marquee Cinemas is a chain of movie theaters in the Eastern United States. Currently, the chain consists of theaters in these cities:

Cape Coral, Florida
Glasgow, Kentucky
Toms River, New Jersey
New Hartford, New York
Morganton, North Carolina
Raleigh, North Carolina
Bristol, Tennessee
Fredericksburg, Virginia
Wytheville, Virginia 
Beckley, West Virginia
Huntington, West Virginia
South Charleston, West Virginia
Summersville, West Virginia
Wheeling, West Virginia

External links 
 Marquee Cinemas's official website

Companies based in West Virginia
Economy of the Eastern United States
Movie theatre chains in the United States
Beckley, West Virginia
1979 establishments in West Virginia